Andrew John Dominique (born October 30, 1975) is an American former first baseman/catcher who played in Major League Baseball in parts of the  and  seasons. Listed at 6' 0", 220 lb., Dominique batted and threw right-handed. He was selected by the Philadelphia Phillies in the 1997 draft out of the University of Nevada.

Primarily a third baseman, Dominique made the Big West Conference All-Star baseball team in 1996 and 1997, while hitting 30 home runs with 97 RBI and a .788 slugging percentage in 1997 to set single-season records and gain BWC player of the year honors. Unfortunately, Dominique never fulfilled the promise he showed in college. He spent seven seasons in the Philadelphia minor league system as a 3B/C/1B before being assigned to the Boston Red Sox at midseason in 2002, by the Phillies. He entered the majors in 2004 with Boston, hitting .182 in seven games, and also made two appearances with the Toronto Blue Jays in 2005. On December 3, 2005, he signed with the Seattle Mariners, but never played a game in their organization.

In parts of two seasons in the major leagues, Dominique was a .154 hitter (2-for-13) with one RBI in nine games. He did not hit a home run. In 927 minor league games, he hit .270 (895-for-3318) with 122 home runs and 569 RBI.

Dominique became a hitting instructor in Reno, Nevada, and he has also become Earl Wooster High School’s head baseball coach.

External links

Big West Conference archives
Hitting Instructor

1975 births
Living people
American expatriate baseball players in Canada
Baseball coaches from California
Baseball players from Los Angeles
Batavia Clippers players
Boston Red Sox players
Major League Baseball catchers
Major League Baseball first basemen
Nevada Wolf Pack baseball players
Nevada Wolf Pack softball coaches
Pawtucket Red Sox players
People from Tarzana, Los Angeles
Piedmont Boll Weevils players
Softball coaches from California
Toronto Blue Jays players
Trenton Thunder players